The Mercury Mariner is a compact crossover SUV that was introduced in 2005.  It is a sibling of the Mazda Tribute and Ford Escape, although it is more  upmarket than the other two.  The Mariner is Mercury's first car-based SUV, and is slotted below the Mountaineer in the lineup.   When Ford eliminated the Mercury brand, the Mariner ended production in October 2010.

The Mariner was officially offered in the U.S., Mexico, Saudi Arabia, Kuwait, and the U.A.E.

First generation

Introduced during the 2005 refresh of the Ford Escape, the Mercury Mariner was positioned above both it and the Mazda Tribute in the compact sport utility vehicle group.  It also includes stylistic differences, such as a two-tone interior, turn signal repeaters borrowed from the European-market Ford Maverick, monotone cladding, and the signature Mercury "waterfall" front grille.  
Unlike its counterparts, a manual transmission was not part of the powertrain lineup.  The Mariner was the first Mercury with a four-cylinder since the Mercury Cougar was dropped in 2002.  For 2006, the lineup was expanded with the introduction of the Mariner Hybrid.

Second generation 

For the second generation for the Mariner, the 2008 model year boasted a thorough redesign, despite remaining on the Ford CD2 platform used by the outgoing generation.

The exterior changes included new seats, headlights, taillights, a new liftgate, a higher beltline, new doors, and new wheels. The interior was also significantly updated with higher quality materials and included more features. The engines remained the same but the 3.0 L Duratec V6 has been modified to reduce fuel consumption by 10%.

Mariner and its Ford Escape sibling were the first vehicles to feature Ford's pull-drift steering compensation, an enhancement made possible by applying software control to the Electric Power Steering (EPS)  system.

The first 2008 Mercury Mariner was unveiled at the South Florida International Auto Show on October 6, 2006, and was touted as a new direction for the Mercury brand.

2009 changes
The 2009 Ford Escape and Mercury Mariner were unveiled at the 2008 Washington Auto Show.

The new 4-cylinder engine was also used in Ford's Escape Hybrid and Mercury Mariner Hybrid. “For every eight Escape and Mariner vehicles we sell, one of them is a hybrid, and the appeal is growing,” says Sue Ciscke, Ford senior vice president, Sustainability, Environment and Safety Engineering.

2010 changes
For the 2010 model year, the Mariner added Ford's MyKey and trailer sway controls as standard on all trim levels. The Mariner also saw the addition of Flex-Fuel, the ability to run using E85 fuel or regular unleaded gasoline with the V6 engine. Mercury removed the Euro-style turn signal repeaters for this model year.

2011 changes
For the 2011 model year, the Mariner featured HD Radio as a standard, but continued with the same features as the 2010 models.  This version of the Mariner was its last, as Ford discontinued the Mercury brand due to declining sales. Ford ended production of the Mariner in October 2010.

The last Mariner rolled off the assembly line on October 5, 2010.

Variants

Hybrid 
 
The Mariner Hybrid powertrain was identical to its sibling, the Ford Escape Hybrid. It was launched to the U.S. market in 2006 and was discontinued in 2010 with the rest of the brand. The Mariner hybrid sold a total of 12,300 units.

Like the Ford Escape Hybrid, the Mariner Hybrid is a "full" hybrid electric system, meaning the system can switch automatically between pure electric power, pure gasoline engine power, or a combination of electric battery and gasoline engine operating together, for maximum performance and efficiency at all speeds and loads. When braking or decelerating, the Mariner's hybrid system uses regenerative braking, where the electric drive motor becomes a generator, converting the vehicle's momentum back to electricity for storage in the batteries. With , the Mariner Hybrid has nearly the same acceleration performance as the conventional  V6 Mariner.

Presidential Edition 

On September 7, 2006, Ford delivered a special "Presidential Edition" Mercury Mariner Hybrid to former President Bill Clinton. Its custom features include:

 LED lighting
 A 120V outlet
 Rear bucket seats
 Center console & rear seat fold-out writing desks
 Personal DVD players for each seat
 Refrigerator
 Increased rear seat legroom

There have also been several undisclosed security modifications made to the vehicle.

Awards
Consumers Digest best buy for 2005, 2006, 2007.
Mercury Mariner Hybrid was awarded 2006 Green Car of the Year.

Sales

See also
List of hybrid vehicles

Notes

External links

Mercury Vehicles.com

Mariner
Compact sport utility vehicles
Luxury sport utility vehicles
All-wheel-drive vehicles
Front-wheel-drive vehicles
Cars introduced in 2005
2010s cars
Hybrid electric vehicles
Partial zero-emissions vehicles
Hybrid sport utility vehicles
Ford CD2 platform